Anomis combinans, the yellow-banded semi-looper moth, is a moth of the family Erebidae. The species was first described by Francis Walker in 1858. It is found in Australia, Sri Lanka, Borneo, New Guinea, Malaysia and Timor.

Description
Its wingspan is about 4 cm. Forewings are dark orange. A faint brown line and a dark mark are found in the middle of each forewing. Costa slightly curved and resemble a hooked tip. Margin doubly recurved. Full-grown caterpillar is about 4 cm long. It is greyish with yellow spots in rows along each side which is edged with black. A white dorsal line also edged in black. Pupation occur in a curled leaf. Caterpillars are known to feed on Hibiscus tiliaceus, Hibiscus heterophyllus and Waltheria americana species.

References

Moths of Asia
Moths described in 1858